Doosra Keval is a 1989 TV serial starring Shahrukh Khan.

Plot 
This is story of a family in which Shahrukh was playing "Keval", a village lad who goes to town and never returns. The story is told as memories of his mother and daughter and the villagers. At the end, Keval's (Shahrukh Khan) friend comes to his home and his family accepts him as the second Keval. This is considered as a reincarnation of Keval. Hence the name "Doosra Keval" (Hindi) or "The Second Keval".

Cast 
 Shahrukh Khan as Keval: A village boy who killed by his close friend for not doing illegal work for him.
 Arun Bali as Kirpal Singh (Keval's uncle: An older person who helps Keval)
 Vineeta Malik  as Keval's mother: A simple housewife.
 Natasha Rana  as Kamla (Keval's sister): A teenaged younger village girl.
 Adil Rana as Mangat Ram
 Rajendra Nath as Dhiru
 Jayshree Arora as Mrs. Ahluwalia (Keval's employer)
 Simran Chadha as Meeta (Keval's love interest)
 Prem Bhatia as Meeta's brother
 Naresh Gosai as Keshav (inspector who handles the case of keval's murder)

References

1989 Indian television series debuts
1980s Indian television series
DD National original programming
Indian drama television series
1989 Indian television series endings
Sikhism in fiction